Eulogio Camacho Tibay (March 11, 1923 - November 19, 2001) was a Filipino inventor. He invented a special screw which can withstand all kinds of motion and vibration, a corrugated plastic roofing assembly, a cigarette filter and an amphibian vehicle.

Tibay, who had a wife and six children, was born in 1923. In 1974 he entered an inventors' contest and came second with his typewriter ribbon re-inker, for which he applied for a patent and was granted. His most recent invention was the "energized artificial leg." "With this invention, a person without a leg can stand, walk, sit, or kneel with just a push of a lever. A draw strap connected to the waist and arms enables the person to walk. When the person walks, he or she swings the arms. Strings are attached to the hands, so when the arms swing back and forth, the motion creates tension, which moves the legs forward and so on." Tibay's most recent project was a perforated wall to run along the whole eastern coast of the Philippines called "Typhoon Breaker."

References

External links

Filipino inventors
1923 births
2001 deaths